Cine Mo! (stylized as CINEMO! and formerly known as SineBox) is a Philippine pay television channel owned and operated by ABS-CBN Corporation and ABS-CBN Film Productions, Inc. (content provider) and it was one of the former freemium channels of ABS-CBN TVplus since 2015. The programming consists of local films and foreign movies.

Cine Mo! is being complemented with its English-language counterpart, Movie Central, which was launched on July 30, 2018 on a free-trial basis.

From its inception until early 2020, Cine Mo! operated Mondays to Saturdays from 5:00 AM to 1:00 AM and Sundays from 5:00 AM to 2:00 AM. However, due to the ongoing COVID-19 pandemic, it used to operate temporarily from 6:00 AM to 1:00 AM on weekdays and from 5:00 AM to 1:00 AM on weekends. On March 8, 2021, Cine Mo! began operating 24/7.

On June 30, 2020, Cine Mo! suspended broadcasting on ABS-CBN TV Plus and Sky Direct due to the alias cease and desist order by the National Telecommunications Commission in connection with the expiration of ABS-CBN franchise. However, Cine Mo! continues to broadcast on Sky Cable and other cable providers.

On October 30, 2020, their cable channel space replaced its former sister channel Liga on various provincial cable providers, following the latter's end of broadcast operations on October 29, 2020 due to the closure of the ABS-CBN Sports division and the non-renewal of the ABS-CBN legislative franchise.

An international feed called Cine Mo! Global is also available worldwide as part of TFC premium channels via cable, satellite, iWantTFC and TFC IPTV. Cine Mo! Global is now broadcasting in full 16:9 / 1080i (HDTV).

See also
ABS-CBN Corporation
Cinema One (a 24-hour cable movie channel owned by Creative Programs)
SolarFlix
TeleRadyo
I Heart Movies
Kapamilya Channel
The Filipino Channel

References

ABS-CBN Corporation channels
Assets owned by ABS-CBN Corporation
Classic television networks
Creative Programs
Filipino-language television stations
Men's interest channels
Movie channels in the Philippines
Television networks in the Philippines
Television channels and stations established in 2011
2011 establishments in the Philippines